Thiruppunavasal  is a coastal village in the  
Avadaiyarkoil Taluk of Pudukkottai District, Tamil Nadu, India.

Siva Temple
The famous Pazhampatinathar / Viruddhapureeswarar Temple which is a Thevara Paadal Petra Sthalam is located here.

Demographics 

As per the 2001 census, Thiruppunavasal had a total population of 3863 with 1929 males and 1934 females. Out of the total population 2792 people were literate.

References

Villages in Pudukkottai district